The 2018 Euroformula Open Championship is a multi-event motor racing championship for single-seat open wheel formula racing cars that held across Europe. The championship features drivers competing in two-litre Formula Three racing cars built by Italian constructor Dallara which conform to the technical regulations, or formula, for the championship. It was the fifth Euroformula Open Championship season.

Teams and drivers
 All cars were Dallara F312 which were powered by Toyota engines.

Race calendar and results
 An eight-round provisional calendar was revealed on 23 October 2017. The calendar will feature the same eight circuits like in 2017. All rounds will support the International GT Open, excepting Jerez. Rounds denoted with a blue background are part of the Spanish Formula Three Championship.

Standings

Euroformula Open Championship

Drivers' championship
Points were awarded as follows:

Rookies' championship
Points were awarded as follows:

Teams' championship
Points were awarded as follows:

Spanish Formula 3 Championship

Drivers' championship
Points were awarded as follows:

Teams' championship
Points were awarded as follows:

Notes

References

External links
 

Euroformula Open Championship seasons
Euroformula Open
Euroformula Open
Euroformula Open